Ernest James Jacqua (October 24, 1882July 27, 1972) was an American academic who was the first president of Scripps College from 1926 to 1942.  He earned degrees from Grinnell College (BA), Columbia University (MA), Union Theological Seminary (ThD), and Harvard University (PHD).

References

Scripps College people
Heads of universities and colleges in the United States
1882 births
1972 deaths
Grinnell College alumni
Columbia University alumni
Harvard University alumni
Multnomah University